The Municipality of Straža is a municipality in southeastern Slovenia. It lies on the banks of the Krka River in the traditional region of Lower Carniola. The municipality was created in 2006 when it split from the City Municipality of Novo Mesto. It is included in the Southeast Slovenia Statistical Region. It has over 3,500 inhabitants. Its seat is Straža.

The main employer was the Novoles company, based in the town as well as a number of smaller companies. There are many vineyards in the area.

Settlements
In addition to the municipal seat of Straža, the municipality also includes the following settlements:

 Dolnje Mraševo
 Drganja Sela
 Jurka Vas
 Loke
 Podgora
 Potok
 Prapreče pri Straži
 Rumanja Vas
 Vavta Vas
 Zalog

Landmarks
There are two churches in the settlement. One is dedicated to Saint Thomas and belongs to the parish of Vavta Vas. It is a medieval building that was restyled in the Baroque in the late 17th century. The second is dedicated to the Assumption of Mary and belongs to the Parish of Prečna. It dates to the late 17th century.

References

External links

 Municipality of Straža at Geopedia
 Municipality of Straža website

Straza
2006 establishments in Slovenia